Lärarinna på vift is a 1941 Swedish romantic comedy film directed by Börje Larsson.

Plot summary 
Karin Berggren is a strict teacher at Sunninge flickpension, a distinguished boarding school for girls in a venerable old castle in Scania in the south of Sweden. The school awaits the son of its founder for an inspection.

The night before the inspection Karin and her colleague Bror sneak away to visit a nightclub in Copenhagen. There, Karin suddenly, when she hears the nightclub singer sing, on a whim wants to see if she possibly could do it better? She gets herself up on stage and starts to sing. And is greeted by cheers and standing ovations.

After her success, Karin is offered an engagement at the nightclub, and accepts it, to be able to raise money to cover the embezzlement of the schools money by a colleague, that has just been discovered. So by daytime she is a teacher in French and by night a seductive nightclub singer in Copenhagen, under the name Lucy Phillips.

When the founders son Peter visits the girls school the following day, he soon understands what is going on and tries to put an end to Karins singing career, convinced that it is not appropriate for a teacher at the school.

Karin's double life is soon discovered at the school and the scandal is a fact. Colleagues gather for deliberation on Karin's future there, but she has already left for Copenhagen to perform. So the colleagues follow her, to see her performance with their own eyes, and there Karin makes her entrance on stage, singing Love's ABC...

Cast
Karin Ekelund as Karin Bergengren, teacher, appearing as a singer under the name Lucy Phillips 
Allan Bohlin as Peter Kullby 
Georg Rydeberg as Doctor Bror Viberg, a teacher
Gull Natorp as Ms Kristin Bruuhn, Principal of Sunninge girls school
Eric Gustafson as Jens Worms-Pedersen, Manager of the nightclub Natuglen in Copenhagen
Hugo Björne as Chairman of the girls school, Count
Eric Abrahamsson as Napoleon Bengtsson, janitor
Hjördis Petterson as Ms Hedberg, a teacher
Diana Miller as Nightclub singer
Liane Linden as Astrid, a pupil
Karin Nordgren as Gertrud Norell, a pupil
Ulla Hodell as Marianne, a pupil
Helga Hallén as a Danish journalist
Ragnar Widestedt as a Danish journalist 
Sigge Fürst as "The Great", Kullbys contact at the nightclub
Artur Rolén as his "accomplice"
Sven Aage Larsen as head waiter at the nightclub
Ester Textorius as Ms Boman, a teacher
Wiktor "Kulörten" Andersson as a Danish journalist
Richard Lund as a teacher

References

External links

1941 films
1940s Swedish-language films
Swedish black-and-white films
1941 romantic comedy films
Swedish romantic comedy films
Films directed by Börje Larsson
1940s Swedish films